Adam Davies (born 27 March 1987) is an English-born former Welsh footballer who played for Cambridge United and the Wales national under-21 football team.

Davies began his career as a schoolboy at Peterborough United before switching to Cambridge as a trainee. He made his first team debut, while still a trainee, on 29 August 2004 when he replaced Stevland Angus as a second-half substitute in Cambridge's 1–0 win away to Boston United in the Football League Trophy. His league debut came on 10 September 2004 when he replaced Justin Walker as a late substitute in the 1–0 win at home to Bristol Rovers. He made one further league appearance, again as a substitute, as Cambridge struggled in the league and were eventually relegated to the Conference at the end of the season.

Davies signed his first professional contract with Cambridge in November 2005.
Despite struggling to hold down a regular place in the Cambridge team, Davies enjoyed international recognition from Wales with his first call up to the Under-21 squad in February 2006 and he has also had trial spells at and Preston North End and Everton.
In a match against Exeter City on 4 April 2006, Davies suffered a horrific injury when he was kicked in the neck whilst challenging for a ball, which resulted in Davies receiving treatment for around 20 minutes whilst the club physio and St. John's Ambulance personnel tended to him. He was discharged from hospital the next day. During a game at Dagenham & Redbridge in August 2006, Davies suffered Anterior Cruciate Ligament damage and was ruled out for the entire season.

References

1987 births
Living people
Sportspeople from Peterborough
Welsh footballers
Cambridge United F.C. players
English Football League players
National League (English football) players
Wales under-21 international footballers
English footballers
Association football fullbacks